Claude Debussy's Préludes are 24 pieces for solo piano, divided into two books of 12 preludes each. Unlike some notable collections of preludes from prior times, such as Chopin's Op. 28 preludes, or the preludes from Johann Sebastian Bach's The Well-Tempered Clavier, Debussy's do not follow a strict pattern of tonal centers.

Each book was written in a matter of months, at an unusually fast pace for Debussy. Book I was written between December 1909 and February 1910, and Book II between the last months of 1912 and early April 1913.

Pieces

Two of the titles were set in quotation marks by Debussy because they are, in fact, quotations: «Les sons et les parfums tournent dans l'air du soir» is from Charles Baudelaire's poem Harmonie du soir ("Evening Harmony"). «Les fées sont d'exquises danseuses» is from J. M. Barrie's book Peter Pan in Kensington Gardens, which Debussy's daughter had received as a gift.

Performance practice
On 3 May 1911, the pianist Jane Mortier (to whom works were dedicated by Bohuslav Martinů and Erik Satie) premiered the entire first book of preludes at the Salle Pleyel in Paris. The German-English pianist Walter Morse Rummel, a student of Leopold Godowsky, gave the premiere of the entire second book of preludes in 1913 in London.

Initially, Debussy and other pianists who gave early performances of the works (including Ricardo Viñes) played them in groups of three or four preludes, which remains a popular approach today. This allows performers to choose preludes with which they have the strongest affinity, or those to which their individual interpretive gifts are most suited.

There is a strong tonal relationship between the preludes that suggests that the published order of the preludes is not arbitrary. For example, the first three preludes in the first book (Danseuses de Delphes, Voiles, and Le Vent dans la Plaine) revolve around the key of B. In these first three preludes, allusions to the key of B disappear and reappear, yet a strong sense of fluidity and connection between the preludes is still maintained.

However, the order of the preludes is not considered imperative, as is the case with Chopin's preludes, for example. Several pianists have performed the set out of order, and at least one recording, by Ivan Ilić, changes the order of the set entirely.

The first complete recording of both sets was made in England in 1938 by the South African pianist Adolph Hallis.

The titles
The titles of the preludes are highly significant, both in terms of their descriptive quality and in the way they were placed in the written score. The titles are written at the end of each work, allowing the performer to experience each individual sound world without being influenced by Debussy's titles beforehand.

At least one of the titles is poetically vague: the exact meaning of Voiles, the title of the second prelude of the first book, is impossible to determine for certain, since plural nouns do not distinguish genders as the singular forms may do (in French, voiles can mean either "veils" or "sails").

The title of the fourth prelude «Les sons et les parfums tournent dans l'air du soir» represents a citation from Charles Baudelaire’s poem Harmonie du soir from his volume of poems Les Fleurs du mal.

Orchestrations and adaptations
Numerous orchestrations have been made of the various preludes, mostly of La fille aux cheveux de lin and La cathédrale engloutie. Complete orchestrations of all 24 preludes include versions by Pavica Gvozdić, Peter Breiner, Luc Brewaeys, Hans Henkemans and Colin Matthews. Sean Osborn and conductor Noam Zur have orchestrated the first book.

The Préludes were adapted to form the dynamic soundtrack of Untitled Goose Game.

References 

Sources

Further reading
 Bruhn, Siglind: Debussys Klaviermusik und ihre bildlichen Inspirationen. (Debussy-Trilogie I), Waldkirch: Edition Gorz 2017, ISBN 978-3-938095-23-2, S. 89-206.
 Bruhn, Siglind: Images and Ideas in Modern French Piano Music: The Extra-Musical Subtext in Piano Works by Ravel, Debussy and Messiaen. Pendragon, 1997. ; paperback edition 2010  -  Google
Gatti, Guido M. "The Piano Works of Claude Debussy." The Musical Quarterly 7.3 (1921): 418–60. Print.
Lesure, François and Howat, Roy. "Debussy, Claude." Grove Music Online. Oxford Music Online, accessed 14 December 2009

External links
 
Debussy's Préludes – A Beginners' Guide – Overview, analysis and the best recordings, The Classic Review
Performances of Book 1 and Book 2 of the Preludes by Paavali Jumppanen from the Isabella Stewart Gardner Museum in MP3 format

 
1910 compositions
1913 compositions